Pietro Luigi Speranza (1801-1879) was the Bishop of Bergamo from 1854 to his death 25 years later.

In 1868 he recognized the Congregation of the Holy Family of Bergamo.

References

External links and additional sources
 (for Chronology of Bishops) 
 (for Chronology of Bishops) 

1801 births
1879 deaths
Bishops of Bergamo
19th-century Italian Roman Catholic bishops